Ornativalva ignota is a moth of the family Gelechiidae. It was described by Sattler in 1967. It is found in Algeria.

Adults have been recorded on wing in March, July and September.

The larvae feed on Tamarix species.

References

Moths described in 1967
Ornativalva